Call Girls of Rome is a 1960 Italian film directed by Daniele D'Anza and starring Andreina Pagnani, Jeanne Valérie, Scilla Gabel, and Elsa Martinelli. Jean Murat also appears.

Plot
Behind the facade of a fashion house in Milan, run by Arabella, lies an efficient high-class prostitution ring.

Cast
Andreina Pagnani as Arabella
Jeanne Valérie as Paola Masetti
Maria Perschy as Claudia
Scilla Gabel as Patrizia
Elsa Martinelli as Marisa, model
Pierre Brice as Aldo, lawyer
Jean Murat as General Masetti, father of Paola and Silvana
Romolo Valli as Commissioner
Roberto Risso as Carlo Malpighi
Corrado Pani as Young Blackmailer
Renato Speziale as Luigi, Arabella's lover
Giuseppe Porelli as Commendator Paolo Iavecchia
Luigi Pavese as Baldoni
Maria Grazia Spina as Silvana
Marilù Tolo as Luigi's mistress
Carlo Pisacane as Neapolitan old man
Paola Barbara as Mrs. Masetti, mother of Paola and Silvana
Aldo Giuffrè as Ernesto
Michele Malaspina as A client of the atelier
Roy Ciccolini as Mori, footballer
Cesarina Gheraldi as Lisa, maid of the Masetti house
Nino Pavese as Inspector De Stefani
Silvano Tranquilli as Deputy Commissioner
Tom Felleghy as Swiss Client
Giulio Marchetti as Another Swiss Client
Arnaldo Ninchi as Footballer
Roberto Bruni as A client of the atelier
Arturo Dominici as A client of the atelier
Laura Nucci as A client of the atelier
Linda Sini as A client of the atelier

References

External links

1960 films
1960s Italian-language films
1960 drama films
Italian drama films
Films scored by Armando Trovajoli
1960s Italian films